Lee Ki Won is a female South Korean former international table tennis player.

Table tennis career
She won three medals at the 1977 World Table Tennis Championships. 

She won a silver medal in the Corbillon Cup (women's team event), a bronze medal in the women's doubles with Kim Soon-ok and another bronze in the mixed doubles with Lee Sang-kuk.

See also
 List of table tennis players
 List of World Table Tennis Championships medalists

References

Year of birth missing (living people)
Living people
South Korean female table tennis players
Asian Games medalists in table tennis
Table tennis players at the 1978 Asian Games
Medalists at the 1978 Asian Games
Asian Games silver medalists for South Korea
Asian Games bronze medalists for South Korea
World Table Tennis Championships medalists
20th-century South Korean women